Taeniogramma tenebrosata is a species of geometrid moth in the family Geometridae. It is found in Central America and North America.

The MONA or Hodges number for Taeniogramma tenebrosata is 6425.

References

Further reading

External links

 

Ennominae
Articles created by Qbugbot
Moths described in 1887